The 1983 FIBA European Championship, commonly called FIBA EuroBasket 1983, was the 23rd FIBA EuroBasket regional basketball championship, held by FIBA Europe. It took place from 26 May to 4 June 1983 in France. Italy defeated Spain in the final to win their first title.

Venues

Qualification
A total of twelve teams qualified for the tournament. To the top eight teams from the previous tournament, four more teams were granted berths via a qualifying tournament.

Top eight teams from Eurobasket 1981:

Top four teams from the qualifying stage:

Squads

Format
The teams were split in two groups of six teams each. The top two teams from each group advance to the semifinals (A1 vs. B2, A2 vs. B1). The winners in the knockout semifinals advance to the Final, and the losers figure in a third-place playoff.
The third and fourth teams from each group competed in the same manner in a separate bracket to define places 5th through 8th in the final standings. The same was done with the last two teams from each group to define 9th through 12th place.

Preliminary round

Group A
Times given below are in Central European Summer Time (UTC+2).

|}

Group B

|}

Knockout stage

Classification rounds

9th to 12th place

5th to 8th place

Championship bracket

Awards

Final standings

References

External links
1983 European Championship for Men archive.FIBA.com
(Nantes 1983) LinguaSport.com

1983
Euro
1983 in French sport
E
Sport in Caen
Sport in Limoges
Sport in Nantes
May 1983 sports events in Europe
June 1983 sports events in Europe